Elias Chacour (born 29 November 1939) is a Palestinian Arab-Israeli who served as the Archbishop of Akko, Haifa, Nazareth and All Galilee of the Melkite Greek Catholic Church from 2006 to 2014. Noted for his efforts to promote reconciliation between Palestinians and Jews, he is the author of two books about the experience of Palestinian people living in present-day Israel. He describes himself as a "Palestinian-Arab-Christian-Israeli."

Biography
Elias Michael Chacour was born in the village of Kafr Bir'im in the Upper Galilee, Mandatory Palestine to a Palestinian Christian family of the Melkite Greek Catholic Church. His family took refuge in the neighboring village of Jish after Bir'im was occupied by Yishuv forces. Chacour and his family became Israeli citizens in 1948, after the establishment of the state. He attended a boarding school in Haifa and then a high school in Nazareth. He studied theology at St. Sulpice Seminary in Paris. Returning to Israel in 1965, he was ordained a priest by Archbishop George Selim Hakim of Akko, Haifa, Nazareth and all Galilee, who became Patriarch Maximos V two years later. He later studied Bible and Talmud as well as Aramaic and Syriac at the Hebrew University of Jerusalem, becoming the first Arab to gain a higher degree there.

Educational activism
Chacour came to the village of Ibillin in the Galilee as a young priest in 1965. This village was the birthplace of the most recent saint of the Melkite Church, Blessed Miriam Bawardy, a Discalced Carmelite mystic of the 19th century responsible for the Carmel of Saint David's Tower in Bethlehem who was beatified by Pope John Paul II on 13 November 1983. Elias, seeing the lack of educational opportunities for Arab youth beyond the 8th grade, set about creating a school open to all local children, regardless of religious affiliation. In the early 1980s, on an empty hillside now known as the Mount of Light (Jebel an-Nour), a classroom building was begun. The newly formed high school moved from temporary quarters in the community center to the new building as soon as it was ready. The original high school has expanded considerably and now includes a kindergarten, primary school, high school and gifted program. The co-educational Mar Elias Educational Institutions enroll 2,750 students from age 3 through 18, including Muslims, Christians, and Druze.

Ecclesiastical career
On February 7, 2006, Chacour was elected by the Melkite Holy Synod as Archbishop of Akko, Haifa, Nazareth and all Galilee. The main city of his diocese is Haifa, the great city of northern Israel. He was consecrated a bishop in the church of Saint Elias in Ibillin and his enthronement in the Haifa Cathedral was broadcast by the Melkite Ecumenical television station "Noursat" which originates in Beirut, Lebanon. Chacour is vice president of the Sabeel Ecumenical Liberation Theology Center.

On 27 January 2014 Pope Francis announced that he had accepted a request from Archbishop Elias Chacour to retire as Archbishop of the Melkite Catholic Church of Akko, Haifa, Nazareth, and all Galilee. The resignation came after he was questioned by Israeli authorities in relation to a charge of sexual harassment and indecent assault.

Views and opinions
An advocate of non-violence, Chacour travels often between the Middle East and other countries around the world. In addition, many visitors, fact-finding missions, and pilgrims have come to Ibillin. In recognition of his humanitarian efforts he has received honors including the World Methodist Peace Award, the Chevalier de la Legion d'Honneur, the Peacemakers in Action Award from the Tanenbaum Center for Interreligious Understanding, and the Niwano Peace Prize (Japan) as well as honorary doctorates from five universities including Duke and Emory. In 2001 Chacour was named "Man of the Year" in Israel.

In 2001, Chacour gave an address at commencement at Emory University, in Atlanta, Georgia, where he accepted an honorary degree. An excerpt from his speech:

From a 9 February 2006 speech regarding becoming Archbishop of Galilee:

Awards
Chacour is the winner of the Niwano Peace Award and has been nominated three times for the Nobel Peace Prize.

Published works
Chacour is the author of two best selling books, Blood Brothers and We Belong to the Land. Blood Brothers covers his childhood growing up in the town of Biram, his development into a young man, and his early years as a priest in Ibillin. This book has been translated into more than twenty languages.

His second book, We Belong to the Land, recounts his work in the development of Mar Elias Educational Institutions, from humble beginnings to major schools for educating Palestinian young people and for helping to bring about reconciliation in a land of strife. This book has been translated into 11 languages.

See also
Boutros Mouallem
Political theology in the Middle East

References

External links

Twelve Days to Jerusalem website
Biography of Archbishop Elias Chacour by GCatholic.org
Pilgrims of Ibillin website

1939 births
Living people
Israeli Arab Christians
Melkite Greek Catholic bishops
Arab citizens of Israel
Palestinian bishops
Palestinian memoirists
Israeli Melkite Greek Catholics
Israeli Christian pacifists
Israeli memoirists
21st-century Eastern Catholic archbishops
20th-century Eastern Catholic bishops